Haplochromis flavus, the yellow rockpicker, is a species of cichlid endemic to the Tanzanian portion of Lake Victoria. This species can reach a length of  SL.

References

flavus
Endemic freshwater fish of Tanzania
Fish of Lake Victoria
Fish described in 1998
Taxonomy articles created by Polbot